Gabriel Moya Sanz (born 20 March 1966) is a Spanish retired footballer who played mostly as an attacking midfielder – he could also operate as a forward.

Club career
Moya was born in Alcalá de Henares, Community of Madrid. During his professional career he played 373 games in La Liga (406 the two major levels of Spanish football combined), making his debut at age 20 with Real Valladolid. He then proceeded to represent Atlético Madrid, Sevilla FC – two spells – Valencia CF and RCD Mallorca, always being a very important attacking unit.

At the end of the 1999–2000 season, after only ten matches and team relegation with Andalusia's Sevilla, Moya retired from football at 34.

International career
During his stint at Valladolid, Moya earned four of his five caps for Spain, the first coming on 13 December 1989 in a 2–1 friendly win against Switzerland, in Santa Cruz de Tenerife.

Honours
Atlético Madrid
Copa del Rey: 1991–92

References

External links

1966 births
Living people
People from Alcalá de Henares
Spanish footballers
Footballers from the Community of Madrid
Association football midfielders
La Liga players
Segunda División players
Segunda División B players
RSD Alcalá players
Real Valladolid players
Atlético Madrid footballers
Sevilla FC players
Valencia CF players
RCD Mallorca players
Spain international footballers